Giuseppe Mani (born 21 June 1936) is an Italian Roman Catholic archbishop, who served as Archbishop of Cagliari from 2003 to 2012.

Biography
Mani was ordained on 12 March 1960 and began his ministry at the Diocese of Fiesole.

On 29 October 1987 he became the Auxiliary bishop of the Diocese of Rome and was consecrated by Cardinal Ugo Poletti on 7 December 1987. He became Military ordinary of Italy on 31 January 1996. On 20 June 2003 Pope John Paul II named him Archbishop of Cagliari.

During Pope Benedict XVI's visit to Cagliari, on 7 September 2008, the archbishop accompanied him to all his public appointments.

References

Living people
21st-century Italian Roman Catholic archbishops
Bishops in Sardinia
20th-century Italian Roman Catholic bishops
1936 births
Rufina